Margaret (1364 in Casale Monferrato – 1420 in Saragosa, Urgell) from the House of Palaeologus-Montferrat, was daughter of the marquess of Montferrat and lady of Acqui. By her marriage, she became countess of Urgell.

Biography
She was daughter of John II, Lord of Asti and Novara and imperial vicar, and Isabel of Majorca. Her father was son of Theodore I, marquess of Montferrat and Argentina Spinola; her mother was daughter of James III of Majorca and his first wife Constance of Aragon.

Margaret was the only daughter of her father; her siblings were the marquesses Secondotto (John III ( and Theodore II.

Her son James II was appointed by the king of Aragon as governor-general (viceroy), i.e. heir, but failed to succeed. His great-grandchild John II of Aviz became king of Portugal.

Family and issue
Margaret married in 1375/6 to her 4th cousin Peter II (1340-1408), count of Urgell, viscount of Àger, baron of Entença and Antillón, who ruled from 1347–1408. He was son of James I, Count of Urgell; Margaret was his second wife. They had issue:
 James II (1380–1433), Count of Urgell, ruled 1408–1413. In 1410, his father's cousin Martin of Aragon died and James II was the closest male relative, but the House of Trastámara, kings of Castile, managed to succeed in the kingdom of Aragon.

Ancestry

Sources
 Alamán, Lucas; Manuel Orozco y Berra. Diccionario universal de historia y de geografía. p. 152.
 E. Michael Gerli, Samuel G. Armistead, ed. (2003). Medieval Iberia: an encyclopedia. Routledge.

References

1364 births
1420 deaths
14th-century Italian women
Palaiologos dynasty
Countesses of Urgell
March of Montferrat